Eel Township is one of fourteen townships in Cass County, Indiana. As of the 2010 census, its population was 18,767.

Geography
According to the USGS, it contains one cemetery, Mount Hope.

References

External links

 Indiana Township Association
 United Township Association of Indiana

Townships in Cass County, Indiana
Townships in Indiana